Kimberly Rhodes (born June 7, 1969) is an American actress who is known for portraying Cindy Harrison on the soap operas Another World (1996–1999) and As the World Turns (2000–2001),  Carey Martin on the Disney Channel sitcoms The Suite Life of Zack & Cody (2005–2008) and The Suite Life on Deck (2008–2011), and Sheriff Jody Mills on Supernatural (2010–2020).

Early life
Rhodes was born and raised in Portland, Oregon. She graduated from Benson Polytechnic High School, and then attended Southern Oregon University, graduating in 1991, and earned a Master of Fine Arts from Temple University.

Career
In 1997, while performing in Another World, Rhodes was nominated, along with Mark Pinter, for a Soap Opera Digest Award as "Favorite New Couple". For Rhodes's first Another World fan club luncheon, she rewrote the lyrics for "All For the Best" from Godspell. Prior to her Disney Channel début, she had previously acted with the Oregon Shakespeare Festival for one season, portraying the roles of "Daphne Stillington" in Noël Coward's Present Laughter and "Helena" in Shakespeare's A Midsummer Night's Dream.

In 2005, Rhodes was cast as Carey Martin on The Suite Life of Zack & Cody. Her character was notorious for her spiky blonde hair and her can-do attitude. She later reprised her role as Carey on the sequel series The Suite Life on Deck from 2008 to 2011. 

In 2010, she was cast as Sheriff Jody Mills on the CW's show Supernatural. She first appeared in Season 5; episode "Dead Men Don't Wear Plaid", with her character appearing in every season since as a guest star.

In 2018, Season 13; episode “Wayward Sisters“ was used as a backdoor pilot for a possible spin-off series of the same name, intended to feature Rhodes and fellow actresses Briana Buckmaster and Kathryn Newton as the main characters. The new series ultimately did not move forward. Rhodes performs, alongside other Supernatural'''s cast members, in Jason Manns' 2018 album "Recovering With Friends''."

Personal life
Rhodes resides in Los Angeles, California, with her husband, actor Travis Hodges. The couple have a daughter, Tabitha Jane, who is autistic. In April 2021, Rhodes revealed that she is also autistic.

Filmography

Awards and nominations

References

External links

 
 
 
 Interview Kim Rhodes with www.mycoven.com March 2012
 Rhodside Attraction - Kim's blog

1969 births
American film actresses
American television actresses
American soap opera actresses
American voice actresses
Living people
Actresses from Portland, Oregon
Southern Oregon University alumni
Temple University alumni
Benson Polytechnic High School alumni
Actors with autism
21st-century American women